Lawrence Alexander Walker (born December 30, 1942) is an American racewalker. He competed in the men's 20 kilometres walk at the 1976 Summer Olympics. Walker also competed in Masters Track and Field competitions and held Masters Records.

References

External links
 

1942 births
Living people
Athletes (track and field) at the 1976 Summer Olympics
American male racewalkers
Olympic track and field athletes of the United States
Track and field athletes from Los Angeles